Ricardo Martins de Araújo (born 20 July 1986), commonly known as Kadu, is a Brazilian professional footballer who plays as a central defender for Chapecoense.

Career
Kadu started his career in Bragantino since the 2006 season. In 2007 Kadu have good actions with Bragantino (fourth place in Campeonato Paulista), and signed to Corinthians, to play Brazilian League.

For Corinthians, Kadu started in the match against Sport Recife, in a nightmare game Kadu scored an own goal against Atlético Paranaense. Before this fact, and the exit of the coach, Paulo César Carpegiani, Kadu had never played any other game for the club.

Honours
Chapecoense
Campeonato Catarinense: 2020
Campeonato Brasileiro Série B: 2020

References

External links

1986 births
Living people
Footballers from Brasília
Brazilian footballers
Association football central defenders
Guarani FC players
Clube Atlético Bragantino players
Sport Club Corinthians Paulista players
Figueirense FC players
Esporte Clube Vitória players
S.C. Braga players
S.C. Braga B players
Club Athletico Paranaense players
Grêmio Foot-Ball Porto Alegrense players
Associação Atlética Ponte Preta players
Göztepe S.K. footballers
Associação Chapecoense de Futebol players
Campeonato Brasileiro Série B players
Campeonato Brasileiro Série A players
Primeira Liga players
Liga Portugal 2 players
Süper Lig players
Brazilian expatriate footballers
Brazilian expatriate sportspeople in Portugal
Expatriate footballers in Portugal
Brazilian expatriate sportspeople in Turkey
Expatriate footballers in Turkey